Adamov (also Adamstädtel) is a municipality and village in České Budějovice District in the South Bohemian Region of the Czech Republic. It has about 1,000 inhabitants.

Notable people
Jan W. Speerger (1896–1950), actor and film director

References

External links

 

Villages in České Budějovice District